Dine Alone Records is a Canadian and American independent record label, founded in St. Catharines and Toronto by Joel Carriere. The label is now based in Toronto, Nashville and Los Angeles.

History 
Dine Alone was born out of founder Joel Carriere's home in St. Catharines, Ontario. After years working various positions in the Canadian music industry and building his own cultural website and promotional company, Carriere launched Dine Alone Records in 2005. With a name drawn from the songs "Dine Alone" by the post-hardcore band Quicksand, and a set of founders who had ties to the North American heavy music scene, Dine Alone worked with artists such as The Fullblast, Johnny Truant, City and Colour and Attack in Black.

Dine Alone quickly expanded its roster from the early days of City and Colour, Arkells, and Bedouin Soundclash to over 50 national and international artists. Dine Alone Records was named the number one independent label and the number four label overall in Canada in Nielsen Soundscan's 2013 year-end report. In 2013, the label expanded into Nashville and furthermore, to Los Angeles in 2014.

In 2015, Dine Alone Records launched a series of events and projects to celebrate their tenth anniversary, including 'Wax on Wheels' – the label's official mobile record shop. Dine Alone Records was named Canadian Independent of the Year at The Canadian Music Industry Awards for the second year in a row in May 2015.

Current roster

...And You Will Know Us by the Trail of Dead
Aero Flynn
Alexisonfire
Amityfalls
The Amazing
The Apache Relay
At the Drive-In
Attack in Black
Brendan Benson
BRONCHO
Bryan Bryne
Vanessa Carlton
Cerebral Ballzy
City and Colour
Sam Coffey & The Iron Lungs
The Cult
The Dandy Warhols
DBOY
Dashboard Confessional
Delta Spirit
Dinosaur Bones
Dune Rats
The Dirty Nil
The Dodos
DZ Deathrays
Edwin Raphael
FIDLAR
Field Report
Fine Points
Fly Golden Eagle
FREEMAN
Gateway Drugs
Hannah Georgas
The Get Up Kids
Glass Towers 
Grade
Noah Gundersen
HBS
Heartless Bastards
Helicon Blue
Hey Marseilles
Hey Rosetta!
High Ends
The Howlin' Brothers
Ivan & Alyosha
JEFF the Brotherhood
The Jezabels
Jimmy Eat World
Kopecky
Langhorne Slim & The Law
Legend of the Seagullmen
Lieutenant
Lucius
The Lumineers
Marilyn Manson
James Vincent McMorrow
Miami Horror
Moneen
Dave Monks
Monster Truck
Music Band
NOBRO
Kate Nash
New Swears
Brendan Philip
PHOX
Pickwick
Quicksand
Chuck Ragan
Respire
Rumba Shaker
Saints & Sinners
Say Anything
Say Yes
Walter Schreifels
The Sheepdogs
Shovels & Rope
Single Mothers
Sleepy Sun
Sol Cat
Solids
Spain
Sparta (band)
Spanish Gold
Spencer Burton
Streets of Laredo (band)
Swervedriver
Tokyo Police Club
Twin Forks
Violent Soho
We Are Scientists
The Weeks
Wintersleep
Wool
The Wytches
You+Me
Yukon Blonde
Zeahorse

Alumni

Arkells
Augustines
Bedouin Soundclash
Billy Bragg
Black Lungs
Brant Bjork
Casey Baker and the Buffalo Sinners
Caveman
Chains of Love
Children Collide
Clear Plastic Masks
Cloud Control
Cunter
Daniel Romano
Data Romance
Deer Tick
Dispatch
Doldrums
Eagulls
Elliot Moss
Empire Air
Gaz Coombes
Great Bloomers
Hacienda
Hanni El Khatib
Hot Hot Heat
Johnny Truant
k-os
Library Voices
Little Comets
Mockingbird Wish Me Luck
Marilyn Manson
Neon Indian
Parlovr
Seaway
Simone Felice
Sleepercar
Songs from a Room
The Civil Wars
The End
The Fullblast
The Golden Dogs
The Pains of Being Pure at Heart
We Barbarians
Words Left Unsaid

Affiliated companies 
Dine Alone has founded three sister labels, based out of the label's Toronto headquarters. In 2013, Dine Alone launched New Damage Records – a developing aggressive rock label (Canadian home to Cancer Bats, Counterparts, KEN mode, Silverstein, Misery Signals, Heart Attack Kids, Architects etc.). 2014 saw the unveiling of Haven Sounds – a hip-hop/EDM and remix label, which signed L.A.-based MOORS, featuring hip-hop artist and actor Lakeith Stanfield. In 2018, Dallas Green (Alexisonfire/City and Colour), launched Still Records as an "imprint" of Dine Alone.

Dine Alone Foods was co-founded with Jordan Hastings (Alexisonfire, Say Yes) and features sauces made in Canada. The line features three flavours, including a classic Southern Blues BBQ sauce, a sweet smoky Northern Soul chipotle BBQ sauce and a spicy Rock N' Roll hot sauce. The sauces are currently distributed through Whole Foods and featured on menus of Toronto eateries such as Let's Be Frank, Boots and Bourbon, The Dog and Bear, and the Hogtown Smoke food truck.

Partnerships and services 
In 2012, Dine Alone partnered with Warner Music Canada to provide marketing services for The Sheepdogs' self-titled album. Additionally, Dine Alone has partnered with Sony Music Canada to provide marketing services in Canada for You & Me's debut album, rose ave..

Dine Alone has partnered with Volu.me in order to act as the first to employ iBeacon technology in a concert setting.

See also
 List of record labels

References

External links

 
Canadian independent record labels
Alternative rock record labels
Record labels established in 2005
2005 establishments in Ontario
Canadian companies established in 2005